This is a list of social fraternities and sororities in France. These are Greek letter social organizations founded in France.

See also
 List of social fraternities and sororities

External links
Sigma Theta Phi International Fraternity
Zeta Lambda Zeta International Sorority

Student organizations in France
Fraternities and sororities
France